Zbruchivka is a village located in Khmelnytskyi Raion, Khmelnytskyi Oblast (province) of western Ukraine.

Notable people
Nadia Meiher

Footnotes

References

Villages in Khmelnytskyi Raion